Syntomostola is a genus of moths in the family Erebidae.

Species
 Syntomostola semiflava Dognin, 1923
 Syntomostola xanthosoma Dognin, 1912

References

Natural History Museum Lepidoptera generic names catalog

Phaegopterina
Moth genera